Italy competed at the 2016 Summer Paralympics in Rio de Janeiro, Brazil, from 7 September to 18 September 2016. The first places the team qualified were for three athletes in sailing events. Martina Caironi has been chosen to carry the nation's flag at the opening ceremony.

Medallists

Archery

Italy qualified seven archers for the Rio Games following their performance at the 2015 World Archery Para Championships. This included four spots in the compound open, 3 for men and 1 for a woman, 2 spots in the recurve open with 1 for a man and 1 for a woman, and 1 spot for a man in the W1 event.

Cycling 

With one pathway for qualification being one highest ranked NPCs on the UCI Para-Cycling male and female Nations Ranking Lists on 31 December 2014, Italy qualified for the 2016 Summer Paralympics in Rio, assuming they continued to meet all other eligibility requirements.

Equestrian 
The country qualified to participate in the team event at the Rio Games.

Paracanoeing

Italy earned a qualifying spot at the 2016 Summer Paralympics in this sport following their performance at the 2015 ICF Canoe Sprint & Paracanoe World Championships in Milan, Italy where the top six finishers in each Paralympic event earned a qualifying spot for their nation. Salvatore Ravalli earned the spot for Italy after finishing sixth in the men's KL1 event.  Federico Mancarella earned another spot for Italy after finishing fourth in the men's KL2 event. Veronica Yoko Plebani earned a third spot for Italy after finishing fifthin the women's KL3 event.

Rowing

One pathway for qualifying for Rio involved having a boat have top eight finish at the 2015 FISA World Rowing Championships in a medal event.  Italy qualified for the 2016 Games under this criterion in the AS Men's Single Sculls event with an eighth-place finish in a time of 04:58.860.  Italy qualified a second boat in the AS Women's Single Sculls event with a sixth-place finish in a time of 05:50.920.  Italy qualified a third boat with a fourth-place finish in the LTA Mixed Coxed Four event in a time of 03:30.980, eleven seconds behind first-place finisher, Great Britain, who had a time of 03:19.560.

Sailing

Italy qualified a boat for one of the three sailing classes at the Games through their results at the 2014 Disabled Sailing World Championships held in Halifax, Nova Scotia, Canada. A crew qualified for the two-person SKUD-18 class.

An alternative pathway for qualifying for Rio involved having a boat have top seven finish at the 2015 Combined World Championships in a medal event where the country had nor already qualified through via the 2014 IFDS Sailing World Championships.  Italy qualified for the 2016 Games under this criterion in the Sonar event with a fourteenth-place finish overall and the sixth country who had not qualified via the 2014 Championships. Italy qualified a second  under this criterion in the 2.4m event with a tenth-place finish overall and the second country who had not qualified via the 2014 Championships.  The boat was crewed by Antonio Squizzato.

Shooting

The country sent shooters to 2015 IPC IPC Shooting World Cup in Osijek, Croatia, where Rio direct qualification was available.  They earned a qualifying spot at this event based on the performance of Nadia Fario in the P4 – 50m Pistol Mixed SH1  event.

The third opportunity for direct qualification for shooters to the Rio Paralympics took place at the 2015 IPC IPC Shooting World Cup in Sydney, Australia.  At this competition, Massimo Croci earned a qualifying spot for their country in the R3 - Mixed 10m Air Rifle Prone SH1 event.

The last direct qualifying event for Rio in shooting took place at the 2015 IPC Shooting World Cup in Fort Benning in November. Pamela Novaglio earned a qualifying spot for their country at this competition in the R5 Mixed 10m Air Rifle Prone SH2 event.

Swimming 

The top two finishers in each Rio medal event at the 2015 IPC Swimming World Championships earned a qualifying spot for their country for Rio. Francesco Bocciardo earned Italy a spot after winning gold in the Men's 400m Freestyle S6.

Wheelchair fencing 

Italy will send eight wheelchair fencers to the Rio Paralympics:
 Matteo Betti - men's individual épée A, men's individual foil A, men's team épée and men's team foil;
 Emanuele Lambertini - men's individual foil A, men's team foil and men's team épée;
 Marco Cima - men's individual foil B, men's team foil and men's team épée;
 Alberto Pellegrini - men's individual sabre A;
 Alessio Sarri- men's individual sabre B and men's individual foil B;
 Loredana Trigilia - women's individual foil A and women's team foil;
 Andrea Mogos - women's individual foil A and women's team foil;
 Beatrice Vio - women's individual foil B and women's team foil.

Wheelchair tennis 
Italy qualified one competitors in the men's single event, Fabian Mazzei.  Italy qualified one player in the women's singles event, Marianna Lauro.  The country also qualified one player in the quad singles event, Alberto Corradi.

See also
Italy at the 2016 Summer Olympics

References

Nations at the 2016 Summer Paralympics
2016
2016 in Italian sport